The 2021–22 PSA World Tour is the international squash tour organised circuit organized by the Professional Squash Association (PSA) for the 2021–22 squash season. It's the 7th PSA season since the merger of PSA and WSA associations in 2015.

The most important tournaments in the series are the PSA World Championship for Men's and Women's. The tour also features two circuits of regular events—PSA World Tour (formerly PSA World Series), which feature the highest prize money and the best fields; and PSA Challenger Tour with prize money ranging $5,500–$30,000. In the middle of the year (usually in June), the PSA World Tour tour is concluded by the Men's and Women's PSA World Tour Finals in Cairo, the season-ending championships for the top 8 rated players from World Tour level tournaments.

Overview

PSA World Tour changes
Starting in August 2018, PSA revamped its professional tour structure in two individual circuits; PSA World Tour and PSA Challenger Tour.

PSA World Tour (formerly PSA World Series) will comprise most important tournaments in prize money for more experienced and higher-ranked players, including PSA World Championships and PSA World Tour Finals, labelled as following:
PSA World Tour Platinum — 48-player draws — $165,000
PSA World Tour Gold — 24-player draws — $97,500–$100,000
PSA World Tour Silver — 24-player draws — $67,500–$70,000
PSA World Tour Bronze — 24-player draws — $45,000–$47,500

PSA Challenger Tour tournaments will offer a $6,000–$30,000 prize-money, ideal circuit for less-experienced and upcoming players, that will include the following tiers:
PSA Challenger Tour 30 — $30,000
PSA Challenger Tour 20 — $20,000
PSA Challenger Tour 10 — $12,000
PSA Challenger Tour 5 — $6,000
PSA Challenger Tour 3 — $3,000 (starting August 2020)

Prize money/ranking points breakdown
PSA World Tour events also have a separate World Tour ranking. Points for this are calculated on a cumulative basis after each World Tour event. The top eight players at the end of the calendar year are then eligible to play in the PSA World Tour Finals.

Ranking points vary according to tournament tier being awarded as follows:

Calendar

Key

August

September

October

November

December

January

February

March

April

May

June

July

Statistical information

The players/nations are sorted by:
 Total number of titles;
 Cumulated importance of those titles;
 Alphabetical order (by family names for players).

Key

Titles won by player (men's)

Titles won by nation (men's)

Titles won by player (women's)

Titles won by nation (women's)

World Championship qualifiers
Winners of a select group of PSA Challenger Tour tournaments chosen by PSA receive a wildcard for the Men's and Women's World Championships. The qualified players are:

Comebacks
 Nour El Tayeb

Retirements
Following is a list of notable players (winners of a main tour title, and/or part of the PSA Men's World Rankings and Women's World Rankings top 30 for at least one month) who announced their retirement from professional squash, became inactive, or were permanently banned from playing, during the 2021–22 season:

 Grégory Gaultier
 Alison Waters
 Coline Aumard
 Tom Richards
 Camille Serme

Current world top 10 players

Men's world ranking

Women's world ranking

See also
2021–22 PSA World Tour Finals
2022 Men's PSA World Tour Finals
2022 Women's PSA World Tour Finals
2022 in squash

References

External links
 PSA World Tour

PSA World Tour seasons
2021 in squash
2022 in squash